Zhongsa Village is an administrative village under the jurisdiction of Danniang Township, Mainling County, Nyingchi City, Tibet, <ref name=" Linzhi City, Tibet,  with the zoning code 540422200203. The grassroots mass autonomous organization in which the village is located is the Zhongsa Villagers' Committee.

Zhongsa Village, one of the 6 administrative villages in Danniang Township,  is adjacent to Luxia Village, Baila Village, Sangba Village, Danniang Village, and Kangbure Village.

References

Populated places in Nyingchi